The Swiks (or Swix) was a three-masted schooner from Åland that sank in the Baltic Sea, off the island of Öland, Sweden, on 21 December 1926.

History
Swiks was built in Upesgriva (between Ventspils and Riga; see Mērsrags), Latvia in 1902, by K. Karkle for Indrik S. Puhlin from Riga. Puhlins nickname was "Svikis" ("super durable"); hence probably the ship's name.

Puhlin operated the ship until 1912, when it was taken over by a partnership with J.E. Johansson as the principal owner and after 1916 with J.M. Andersson; she was based in Vårdö in Åland. She was then sold to Arthur Lundqvist in 1924.

Characteristics
She had a net tonnage of 227 tons and the payload of 135 virke.

Wreck
The ship, with a crew of seven, was sailing from Flensburg, Germany to her homeport, Mariehamn, with only ballast on board. A snowstorm forced the ship to try to round north of Öland, to seek shelter in Kalmar, but the rounding attempt failed and the ship got stuck in the sand dunes below the water (Änggärdsudden) near the beach of Trollskogen. The crew abandoned ship and got to land in a lifeboat, walking through the forest of Trollskogen before reaching Grankullavik, where they were cared for a week. One crew member had gotten blood poisoning from a rusty nail and was cared for in hospital.

The wreck of the Swiks lay off the beach until a winter storm in the 1950s threw her up on the beach, where she broke in two. Some farmers from Böda bought it hoping to be able to salvage the wood and iron, but this proved too costly. In 1977 one of the sides was still intact.

References

External links
Photo of men aboard Swiks, in collection of Maritime Museum (Stockholm)

1902 ships
Ships built in Russia
Tall ships of Finland
Merchant ships of Finland
Transport in Åland
Maritime incidents in 1926
Shipwrecks in the Baltic Sea
Shipwrecks of Sweden